No. 1300 (Meteorological) Flight was formed on 31 July 1943 at RAF Alipore, West Bengal, British India, by re-designating No. 1 Meteorological Flight RAF. The flight, strength of which had been reduced to three Hawker Hurricane Mk.IIs by this time, was disbanded on 30 May 1946 at RAF Kallang, Malaya, as No. 1300 (Meteorological THUM) Flight, THUM standing for Temperature and Humidity.

No. 1300 (Meteorological Reconnaissance) Flight was re-formed on 1 June 1946 at RAF Mingaladon, Burma, moving to RAF Butterworth, in Malaya, where it disbanded on 15 March 1947 to become No. 18 Squadron RAF.

Aircraft operated

Flight bases

See also
List of RAF Regiment units
List of Fleet Air Arm aircraft squadrons
List of Army Air Corps aircraft units
List of Air Training Corps squadrons
List of Battle of Britain squadrons
University Air Squadron
Air Experience Flight
Volunteer Gliding Squadron
List of Royal Air Force units & establishments
List of Royal Air Force schools
List of Royal Air Force aircraft independent flights
List of RAF squadron codes

References
Notes

Bibliography

 Delve, Ken. The Source Book of the RAF. Shrewsbury, Shropshire, UK: Airlife Publishing, 1994. .
 Lake, Alan. Flying Units of the RAF. Shrewsbury, Shropshire, UK: Airlife Publishing, 1999. .
 Sturtivant, Ray, ISO and John Hamlin. RAF Flying Training And Support Units since 1912. Tonbridge, Kent, UK: Air-Britain (Historians) Ltd., 2007. .

1300 Flight
Military units and formations established in 1943